Onapristone (developmental code names ZK-89299, ZK-299) is a synthetic and steroidal antiprogestogen with additional antiglucocorticoid activity which was developed by Schering and described in 1984 but was never marketed. It is a silent antagonist of the progesterone receptor (PR), in contrast to the related antiprogestogen mifepristone (which is a weak partial agonist of the receptor). Moreover, compared to mifepristone, onapristone has reduced antiglucocorticoid activity, shows little antiandrogenic activity, and has 10- to 30-fold greater potency as an antiprogestogen. The medication was under development for clinical use, for instance in the treatment of breast cancer and as an endometrial contraceptive, but was discontinued during phase III clinical trials in 1995 due to findings that liver function abnormalities developed in a majority patients.

Onapristone has been found to be effective in the treatment of breast cancer.

As of 2016, onapristone has re-emerged and is under development for the treatment of prostate cancer, currently in phase II clinical trials. It was also under development for the treatment of endometrial cancer, breast cancer, ovarian cancer, and uterine cancer, but was discontinued for these indications in favor of focusing on prostate cancer.

See also
 List of investigational sex-hormonal agents § Progestogenics
 Aglepristone
 Lilopristone
 Telapristone
 Toripristone

References

Abortifacients
1-Ethylcyclopentanols
Dimethylamino compounds
Antiglucocorticoids
Antineoplastic drugs
Antiprogestogens
Estranes
Experimental cancer drugs
Enones